The Santa Monica Parish Church, also called Panay Church,  is a historic church in Panay, near Roxas City in the province of Capiz, on Panay island in the Western Visayas region of the Philippines. It was built in 1884 on the site of an earlier church, built in 1774 by Miguel Murguia, which was gravely damaged by the typhoon of 17 January 1875. The church is built of coral blocks and is approximately 70 metres long, 25 m in width and 18 m in height; the walls are about 3 metres thick.

The church has an unusually large bell, the largest in the country and in all of Asia. This was cast by Juan Reina in about 1884, using sacks of coin given by the people of the town; it weighs more than 10 tonnes.

In 1997 the church was declared a National Historical Landmark by the National Historical Commission of the Philippines.

Image gallery

See also
Roxas Cathedral

References

Churches in Capiz
Roman Catholic churches in Capiz